Ebejer is a surname. Notable people with the surname include:

Francis Ebejer (1925–1993), Maltese dramatist and novelist
Walter Michael Ebejer (1929–2021), Maltese missionary, lecturer and a retired bishop of the Catholic Church

See also

Edsel Dope (Brian Charles Ebejer, born 1974), lead singer of Dope